Panacea is an unincorporated community in Wakulla County, Florida, United States.

History
The community was known as Smith Springs until 1893 when some Bostonians purchased the land about the five springs here and renamed the town Panacea, after the goddess of universal remedy, because of the curative properties of the waters. Most of the development in the area was destroyed by a hurricane in 1928.

During the Civil War a large plant here supplied salt for much of western Florida.

Demographics

2020 census

As of the 2020 United States census, there were 735 people, 284 households, and 199 families residing in the CDP.

Transportation
It is the only airport in Wakulla County.

References

External links 

Unincorporated communities in Wakulla County, Florida
Tallahassee metropolitan area
Unincorporated communities in Florida
Census-designated places in Florida